Ceri Holland (born 12 December 1997) is a Welsh professional footballer who plays as a midfielder for Liverpool in the Women's Super League and the Wales national team.

References 

Living people
1997 births
Liverpool F.C. Women players
Welsh women's footballers
Wales women's international footballers
Women's association football defenders
Manchester City W.F.C. players
Kansas Jayhawks women's soccer players